The International Chamber of Commerce (ICC; French: Chambre de commerce internationale) is the largest, most representative business organization in the world. Its over 45 million members in over 100 countries have interests spanning every sector of private enterprise.

ICC's current chair is María Fernanda Garza and John W.H. Denton AO is the current Secretary General.

ICC has three main activities: rule setting, dispute resolution, and policy advocacy. Because its member companies and associations are themselves engaged in international business, ICC has unrivalled authority in making rules that govern the conduct of business across borders. Although these rules are voluntary, they are observed in thousands of transactions every day and have become part of international trade.

A world network of national committees in over 100 countries advocates business priorities at national and regional level. More than 3,000 experts drawn from ICC's member companies feed their knowledge and experience into crafting the ICC stance on specific business issues.

ICC supports the work of the United Nations, the World Trade Organization, and many other intergovernmental bodies, both international and regional, such as G20 on behalf of international business. ICC was the first organization granted general consultative status with the United Nations Economic and Social Council and UN Observer Status.

History 
The International Chamber of Commerce was founded in 1919 to serve world business by promoting trade and investment, open markets for goods and services, and the free flow of capital. Its international secretariat was established in Paris and its International Court of Arbitration in 1923. Its first chairman was French Minister of Finance Étienne Clémentel.

Membership 
Membership is gained through affiliation with an ICC national committee or via direct application to the ICC International Secretariat.

Governing bodies

World Council

ICC's supreme governing body is the World Council, consisting of representatives of national committees. The World Council elects ICC's highest officers, including the Chairman and the Vice-Chairman, each of whom serves a two-year term. The Chairman, Vice-Chairman and the Honorary Chairman (the immediate past Chairman) provide the organization with high-level leadership.

Executive board
Strategic direction for ICC is provided by its executive board, consisting of up to 30 business leaders and ex-officio members. It is elected by the World Council on the recommendation of the Chairmanship. Meeting three times a year, the Executive Board oversees the establishment of ICC's strategic priorities and the implementation of its policies.

International Secretariat
The ICC International Secretariat, based in Paris, is the operational arm of ICC. It develops and carries out ICC's work programme, feeding business views into intergovernmental organizations on issues that directly affect business operations. The International Secretariat is led by the Secretary General, who is appointed by the World Council.

National committees
In 92 of the world's nations, members have established formal ICC structures called national committees. In countries where there is no national committee, companies and organizations such as chambers of commerce and professional associations can become direct members.

Finance Committee
The Finance Committee advises the Executive Board on all financial matters. On behalf of the Executive Board, it prepares the budget and regularly reports to the board. It reviews the financial implications of ICC activities and supervises the flow of revenues and expenses of the organization.

Dispute resolution services 
ICC's administered dispute resolution services help solve difficulties in international business. ICC Arbitration is a private procedure that leads to a binding and enforceable decision.

The International Court of Arbitration of the International Chamber of Commerce steers ICC Arbitration and has received over 24,000 cases since its inception in 1923. Over the past decade, the court's workload has considerably expanded.

The court's membership has also grown and covers 85 countries and territories. With representatives in North America, Latin and Central America, Africa and the Middle East and Asia, the ICC Court has significantly increased its training activities on all continents and in all major languages used in international trade.

ICC Dispute Resolution Services exist in many forms:
Arbitration is a flexible and efficient dispute resolution procedure leading to binding and final decisions subject to enforcement worldwide.
Mediation is a flexible technique, conducted privately and confidentially, in which a neutral facilitator helps parties to seek a negotiated settlement of their dispute.
Dispute boards are independent bodies designed to help resolve disagreements arising during the course of a contract.
Expertise is a way of finding the right person to make an independent assessment on any subject relevant to business operations.
DOCDEX provides expert decisions to resolve disputes related to documentary credits, collections and demand guarantees, incorporating ICC banking rules.

Expedited or 'fast-track' arbitration procedures automatically apply where disputes are worth US$2 million or less, if the arbitration agreement was made after 1 March 2017, unless the parties have specifically opted out of the expedited procedure in their agreement.

Policy and business practices 
ICC policies, rules and standards are prepared by specialized working bodies. Normal procedure requires policy statements first to be adopted by a commission, in consultation with national committees, and then approved by the Executive Board, before they can be regarded as official and public ICC positions.

Commissions examine major policy issues of interest to world business. Each national committee (NC) or group may appoint delegates to represent it at meetings. Officers are appointed by the Chairman and Secretary General in consultation with NCs. Meetings of commissions are normally held twice a year.

Task forces are constituted under the various commissions for a limited period to undertake specific projects and report back to their parent commission. Some task forces may include representatives of more than one commission.

Code of Advertising and Marketing Communication Practice 
In September 2011, the International Chamber of Commerce introduced the newly revised consolidated ICC Code of Advertising and Marketing Communication Practice, along with a dedicated website, www.codescentre.com, to guide advertising and marketing professionals around the globe. This Code sets ethical standards and guidelines for businesses using today's rapidly changing technology, tools and techniques to market products and services. Developed by experts from all sectors of industry and all regions of the world, the code's purpose is to protect consumers by setting out guidelines for responsible marketing.

The Code is structured in two main sections—General Provisions and Chapters. The General Provisions section contains fundamental principles and other broad concepts that apply to all marketing in all media. Code Chapters are detailed and apply to specific marketing areas, including: Sales Promotion, Sponsorship, Direct Marketing, Digital Media and Environmental Marketing Claim.

World Chambers Federation 
In 1951, ICC established the World Chambers Federation (WCF), formerly the International Bureau of Chambers of Commerce. WCF is the unique global forum uniting the worldwide network of more than 12,000 chambers of commerce and industry. It aims to facilitate the exchange of best practice and the development of new global products and services for chambers, and foster international partnerships between chambers and other stakeholders to help local businesses grow. WCF is a non-political, non-governmental body, with its membership comprising local, regional, national, bilateral and transnational chambers of commerce, as well as public-law and private-law chambers.

WCF was established by ICC and its chamber members following a resolution at the conclusion of the World Congress of Chambers of Commerce (Rome 1950). At its inaugural committee meeting held in Paris in December 1950, WCF was to be first known as the International Information Bureau of Chambers of Commerce. As its role expanded and grew during the 1960s, its name changed to become the International Bureau of Chambers of Commerce and by June 2001, it became known as the World Chambers Federation.

With a history spanning over 400 years, chambers today exist in almost every country and business community around the world. Chambers of Commerce and Industry can be defined as:
 multi-sector organizations that accept members without sectorial restrictions
 not pursuing political goals (i.e., they do not participate in elections or nominate candidates for political positions)
 acting as a voice for the business community (i.e., they advocate for business and promote legislation that is advantageous to business) 
 facilitating the role of chambers of commerce as local business support agencies
 Administering the international guarantee chain of ATA Carnets, the Customs document allowing the duty-free and tax-free temporary import of goods 
 Improving the capacity of chambers in issuing certificates of origin, including the management of an International CO chain 
 World Chambers Network – a website platform with services including a Global Chamber Directory, Business Opportunities Promotion Service ChamberTrust Business Accreditation Programme
 Chamber Professional and institutional development services

WCF also organizes the World Chambers Congress every two years in a different region of the world. The Congress is the only international forum for chamber leaders and professionals to share best practices, exchange insights, develop networks, address the latest business issues affecting their communities, and learn about new areas of innovation from chambers around the world.

During the Congress, WCF also announces the winners of World Chambers Competition, the only global awards program to recognize the most innovative projects undertaken by chambers of commerce and industry from around the world.

Training and events 
Staged all over the world, ICC events range from large topical conferences to training sessions for small groups. These smaller courses share ICC's expertise on commercial arbitration and dispute resolution mechanisms as well as ICC's trade tools including Incoterms rules, Uniform Customs and Practice for Documentary Credits (UCP) and international contracts.

ICC Academy is the training arm of the International Chamber of Commerce and delivers online certification and professional development services to meet the educational needs of banks, corporate and other organizations at the forefront of international trade. The specialized programs, e-courses and certifications are designed by the International Chamber of Commerce’s experts and practitioners.

Publications 
ICC Publications is the publishing arm of the International Chamber of Commerce providing business with essential resources in three broad categories: ICC rules and guidelines, practical commentaries, and reference works. The content of ICC's publications is derived from the work of ICC commissions, institutions and individual international experts.

ICC publishes mainly for international lawyers, arbitrators, bankers, traders and students  covering topics such as international banking, international trade reference and terms, law and arbitration, counterfeiting and fraud and model commercial contracts. The best-known publications, Uniform Customs and Practice for Documentary Credits and Incoterms, have been translated into more than 30 languages.

ICC offers its publications not only in the traditional paper format, but also in electronic format, eBooks, on the ICC Store.

Commercial Crime Services 

ICC Commercial Crime Services (CCS) provides the world business community with a centralized commercial crime-fighting body. It draws on the resources of its members in the fight against commercial crime on many fronts.

From its base in London, and comprising three distinct bureaux, CCS operates according to two basic principles: to prevent commercial crime and to investigate and help prosecute criminals involved in commercial crime.

The specialized divisions of CCS are:
International Maritime Bureau
Financial Investigation Bureau
Counterfeiting Intelligence Bureau
FraudNet

Special projects and initiatives

Business Action to Stop Counterfeiting and Piracy (BASCAP)

ICC established BASCAP to take a leading role in the fight against counterfeiting and piracy.

BASCAP unites the global business community to identify and address intellectual property rights issues and petition for greater commitments by local, national and international officials in the enforcement and protection of IPR.

The work of BASCAP aims to:
Increase both awareness and understanding of counterfeiting and piracy activities and the associated economic and social harm
Compel government action and allocation of resources toward improved IPR enforcement
Create a culture change to ensure intellectual property is respected and protected

BASCAP speaks out on the damage caused by counterfeiting and piracy, including:
Harm to the economy, loss of employment prospects
Danger to consumer health and safety
Loss of innovation and poor quality products
Financial links to organized crime
Erosion of technology transfer

Business Action to Support the Information Society

ICC set up BASIS (Business Action to Support the Information Society) in mid-2006 to speak out on a wide range of critical issues, including:
Internet governance matters such as data protection, privacy, security, and the technical management and coordination of the Internet
liberalization of the telecoms market
entrepreneurship
innovation
ICTs as tools for development

Commission on Anti-Corruption
The ICC's Rules of Conduct aim to "place an efficient and well-run integrity programme" to deal with corruption, extortion and bribery.

The ICC's Commission on Anti-Corruption first published “Fighting Corruption, A Corporate Practices Manual” in 1999; the manual provides "detailed practical guidance for compliance with the ICC Rules of Conduct and the OECD Convention".
at Mérida, Mexico on 9 December 2003. There are nine rules of conduct for business "of a general nature", to be accepted on a voluntary basis and applied through self-regulation within the context of the national laws on bribery which apply to each business. The ICC sees its role, and the function of its Commission on Anti-Corruption, to "promote the widest possible use of the Rules".

Business World Trade Agenda

The ICC, in partnership with the Qatar Chamber, launched the ICC Business World Trade Agenda initiative in March 2012 to provide private sector leadership in shaping a new multilateral trade policy agenda. The aim of this initiative is ultimately to drive World Trade Organization (WTO) multilateral trade talks out of an 11-year deadlock and "beyond Doha".

The World Trade Agenda is a strong business-led initiative to bolster rules-based trade. The WTO lends its support to this initiative by engaging business to provide recommendations to advance global trade negotiations.

The World Trade Agenda aims to:
Define multilateral trade negotiation priorities for business
Help governments set a trade policy agenda for the 21st century that contributes to economic growth and job creation
Find answers to the current economic crisis and drive more effective trade talks
Set concrete recommendations to advance global trade negotiations
Sound the alarm on protectionism
Gather input and validation from the global business community on trade agenda priorities and recommendations for achieving a Doha victory

Since its launch, the World Trade Agenda initiative has organized consultations with CEOs and senior executives in all major regions of the world to gather input and validation of its recommendations. These business priorities were released during the ICC World Trade Agenda Summit on 22 April 2013 in Doha.

The Agreement on Trade Facilitation was finally adopted at the WTO's 9th Ministerial Conference on 7 December 2013. It was the first major agreement on trade facilitation to have been reached since the creation of the WTO.

United Nations representation

Since 1946, ICC has held top-level consultative status with the United Nations and a close working relationship with its specialized agencies. The current ICC Permanent Representative to the UN is Andrew Wilson. On 21 December 2016 the International Chamber of Commerce was granted Observer status by the General Assembly of the United Nations on the basis of General Assembly Resolution (A/RES/71/156) On 13 December 2016, ICC was granted Observer Status by 193 members of the UN General Assembly. ICC took up its position as Observer to the General Assembly on 1 January 2017.

Research foundation 

The ICC Research Foundation (ICCRF) was established in 2010 by ICC to commission independent research that contributes to public knowledge, education and debate on the benefits of global trade and investment. The research projects funded by the ICCRF and conducted by leading international researchers and organizations, contribute to the following aims:
Demonstrate how employment and growth flow from an expansion of international trade and investment
Establish that a multilateral approach is particularly beneficial to that end
Document how protectionism works against the public interest by eroding employment, sustainable growth and the market economy
Promote a deeper understanding by policymakers, the media and the public at large of the benefits of global trade and investment

The ICC Research Foundation is governed by a board of trustees, who include Cherie Nursalim and Gerard Worms.

See also
 Incoterms
 United States Chamber of Commerce
 Federation of Pakistan Chambers of Commerce & Industry
 London Chamber of Commerce & Industry

References

External links 

 

International business organizations
International organizations based in France
Chambers of commerce
Arbitration organizations
Organizations based in Paris